Bianca Maria Bazaliu (born 30 July 1997) is a Romanian handballer who plays as a left back for RK Podravka Koprivnica.

Career
She was capped for the Romanian national team, finished second on the top scorers' list of the 2014 Youth World Championship with 76 goals, clinched the first place with the national team and was voted into the all-star team as the best left back of the tournament.

She was given the award of Cetățean de onoare ("Honorary Citizen") of her hometown Slatina in 2014.

She was also given the award of Cetățean de onoare ("Honorary Citizen") of the city of Bucharest in 2016.

International honours 
EHF Champions League:
Gold Medalist: 2016
Bronze Medalist: 2017, 2018
Youth World Championship:
Gold Medalist: 2014
Bucharest Trophy:
Gold Medalist: 2014

Awards and recognition
 All-Star Left Back of the IHF Youth World Championship: 2014

References

1997 births
Living people
Sportspeople from Slatina, Romania
Romanian female handball players
RK Podravka Koprivnica players